"Truth" is a song by the British indie rock band Bloc Party, released as the third single from the band's fourth album Four on 25 February 2013.

Music video
A video for the song, shot in November 2012, was released onto YouTube on 15 January 2013. The video was shot at 120 frames per second by Clemens Habicht, as it shows the members of the band dancing and jumping through colored smoke clouds in an open field.

It is the last music video to feature the band's original lineup, as their next music video (for "Ratchet") consists of footage from some of the band's previous music videos.

Track listing

Personnel
Bloc Party
Kele Okereke - lead vocals, rhythm guitar
Russell Lissack - lead guitar
Gordon Moakes - bass guitar, backing vocals
Matt Tong - drums, backing vocals

Production
Alex Newport - producer

References

2013 songs
2013 singles
Bloc Party songs
Songs written by Kele Okereke
Frenchkiss Records singles
Songs written by Gordon Moakes
Songs written by Russell Lissack
Songs written by Matt Tong